Cerebrospinal fluid diversion is a procedure that is used to drain fluid from the brain and spinal cord. A shunt is placed in a ventricle of the brain and threaded under the skin to another part of the body, usually the abdomen. It is used to treat hydrocephalus and idiopathic intracranial hypertension.

References
 

Neurology procedures